The Cathedral Basilica of the Sacred Heart, the fifth-largest cathedral in North America, is the seat of the Roman Catholic Archdiocese of Newark.  It is located at 89 Ridge Street in the Lower Broadway neighborhood of Newark, New Jersey. Construction began in 1899 and was finished in 1954.  The original design called for an English-Irish Gothic Revival church, but plans were later modified in favor of a French Gothic Revival style.

Planning for the church
The Cathedral of the Sacred Heart was proposed in 1859 by James Roosevelt Bayley, the Bishop of Newark, just six years after his appointment by Pope Pius IX. In 1870, Bishop Bailey sent architect Jeremiah O'Rourke and Monsignor George Hobart Doane to Europe to view various cathedrals.

Proposed sites included a corner at High and Kinney Streets and an alternate at South and Broad Streets. However, the current site, next to Branch Brook Park in the Forest Hill section of Newark's North Ward, was chosen.  Bayley waited to buy the land until the site was recommended by O'Rourke, the architect of the planned cathedral; and Monsignor Doane. Doane liked the current site because it "commands a view of the Orange Mountains on the west and the Newark Valley, the hills of Staten Island, and New York on the east." The property purchase was completed January 2, 1871, for US$60,000.

In 1872, Bayley was elevated to Archbishop of Baltimore and the project was handed over to the new bishop, Michael Corrigan. Corrigan ordered the excavation of the site in 1875 and 1876. In 1881, the project was handed over to yet another new bishop, Winand Wigger.

The City of Newark wanted to buy the site for the new Newark High School in 1896 but was rejected by Wigger. As the plans moved on, Wigger erected a temporary church under the same name on February 15, 1889. In July 1897, a fundraiser was started to build the cathedral. O'Rourke was chosen to design an English-Irish gothic design.  In accepting the commission, O'Rourke pledged to Wigger that the work would be "a labor of love and not of fees and profits."

Construction

Early stages
Following groundbreaking in January 1898, the cornerstone was laid on June 11, 1899. O'Rourke wanted to get the walls and towers built first and selected a Vermont Rockport granite as the exterior stone. By 1902, the walls then stood 50-feet at the nave and ambulatory, with the first four tiers of the front towers under construction. Wigger died on January 5, 1901, and the new bishop, John Joseph O'Connor, asked O'Rourke to cut costs not to exceed a price tag of US$1 million.

Halt in construction

O'Rourke was removed as head architect in 1910 following a series of feuds between O'Rourke and another architect. The new architect, Mr. Waldron noticed a dangerous shift in weight and hired Fred Metcalf to observe this shift. An order went out to remove all 24 pillars, excavate underneath, re-level the ground and reset 22 pillars. As the arches and clerestory began to rise in the latter half of 1910, architects provided extra reinforcement in the form of steel girders at the clerestory level down either side of the nave and around the ambulatory.

Design changes

The original English/Irish-gothic style was switched to a French-gothic one with those plans accepted in June 1913 and work starting in August 1913.  Changes included:

  eliminating the spires to reduce the weight loads on the tower;
  eliminating the exterior nave buttresses and pinnacles,;
  substituting three rose windows instead of a concentric-circle design; and
  increasing use of sculptures at the entrances.

The Last stage

By 1918, construction moved at a steady pace to allow the completion of the steel-slated roof in November 1919.  The granite tympanum canopies and medallions were finished and, by July 1924, the windows were completed.  With this, the building was finally insulated for the first time since the construction's start. The carving of the medallions' scriptural scenes and bishops' portraits took place on-site between April 1922 and November 1924 under the direction of Rochette and Parzini of New York City.

In 1925, officials wanted the cathedral completed by December 1926, to coincide with the 50th anniversary of O'Connor's ordination as a priest.  The dedication was postponed because of a dispute over the type of limestone used and the many delays in construction. Limestone installation, vaulting, the work on the sanctuary floor and sacristies continued.

With O'Connor's death in May 1927, construction focus shifted to the crypt where he would be laid to rest.

General work re-commenced in August 1927 and ended some months later with the installation of an Italian Botticino-marble altar purchased from Benziger Brothers  of New York City.

Pre-dedication

The new bishop, Thomas Joseph Walsh, opened the cathedral even though construction was ongoing. Walsh believed it was time for the cathedral to be open even though it was unfinished.

The first ordination was his own as Bishop of Newark on May 1, 1928.  A Pontifical Mass followed, celebrated by Father Joseph H. Conroy, with a crowd of nearly 4,000 people.

Walsh's elevation to Archbishop of Newark took place on April 27, 1938.  He celebrated his Silver Jubilee on July 29, 1943, and the 50th anniversary of his ordination as a priest on May 1, 1950.

During the pre-dedication, Walsh ordained six bishops in the cathedral.

Dedication
After nearly 95 years of planning and building, Thomas Aloysius Boland, Archbishop of Newark, finally dedicated the Cathedral of the Sacred Heart on October 19, 1954. During the ceremony, Boland received the pallium from then-Archbishop Amleto Giovanni Cicognani, Apostolic Nuncio (delegate) to the United States.

Post-dedication
The Reverend Monsignor Joseph A. Doyle, who spent his entire priestly life in the cathedral parish, was appointed first rector.

In addition to the six bishops he ordained during the pre-dedication, Boland ordained many priests in this cathedral and showed people's contributions in this church.

Thousands came to celebrate his Golden Jubilee in 1972. In 1974, Pope Paul VI named as Boland's successor Peter Leo Gerety from Portland, Maine.

Visit by Pope John Paul II and cathedral's elevation to basilica
During Pope John Paul II's visit to the United States in 1995, he celebrated evening prayer at the cathedral.  At this occasion, the Cathedral of the Sacred Heart was elevated to a minor basilica to become the Cathedral Basilica of the Sacred Heart.

Music at the cathedral basilica

The cathedral basilica holds concerts open to the public throughout the year and it has the largest pipe organ ever built by the Schantz Organ Co. which includes 154 stops playable from two consoles. When installed in 1953, the organ held 144 stops, it was expanded and renovated in 1989.

See also 
List of Catholic cathedrals in the United States
List of cathedrals in the United States
List of largest church buildings
 National Register of Historic Places listings in Essex County, New Jersey

Notes

References
cathedralbasilica.org/history/index.html, the cathedral basilica's official website

Gothic Pride: The Story of Building a Great Cathedral in Newark

External links

Official Cathedral Site
Roman Catholic Archdiocese of Newark Official Site

Sacred Heart Newark
Sacred Heart Newark
Sacred Heart (Newark, New Jersey), Cathedral Basilica of the
Sacred Heart (Newark, New Jersey), Cathedral Basilica of the
Sacred Heart (Newark, New Jersey), Cathedral Basilica of the
Sacred Heart (Newark, New Jersey), Cathedral Basilica of the
Schickel & Ditmars church buildings